The Xijing Zaji, translated into English as Miscellaneous Records of the Western Capital, is an ancient Chinese collection of short stories. The collection, which is of uncertain authorship, includes 129 stories that mostly takes place in Chang'an, capital of the Western Han dynasty.   Although the stories within the collection supposedly dates back to the late Western Han, however, most modern scholars consider the collection a later work, no earlier than the 3rd century (with Ge Hong being named as its compiler or one of its main editors), with stories being added during the 4th century and later.

References

Chinese anthologies
Chinese short story collections
4th-century books
5th-century books